Occupational Safety and Health (Dock Work) Convention, 1979 is  an International Labour Organization Convention.

It was established in 1979, with the preamble stating:
Having decided upon the adoption of certain proposals with regard to the revision of the Protection against Accidents (Dockers) Convention (Revised), 1932 (No. 32),..

Modification 
The principles contained in the convention are a revision of those contained in ILO Convention C32.

Ratifications
As of 2022, the convention has been ratified by 27 states.

External links 
Official ILO site.
Text of the Convention.
Ratifications.

Health treaties
Occupational safety and health treaties
International Labour Organization conventions
Treaties concluded in 1979
Treaties entered into force in 1981
Treaties of Brazil
Treaties of the Republic of the Congo
Treaties of Cuba
Treaties of Cyprus
Treaties of Denmark
Treaties of Ecuador
Treaties of Egypt
Treaties of Finland
Treaties of France
Treaties of West Germany
Treaties of Italy
Treaties of Guinea
Treaties of Ba'athist Iraq
Treaties of Jamaica
Treaties of Lebanon
Treaties of Mexico
Treaties of Moldova
Treaties of the Netherlands
Treaties of Norway
Treaties of Peru
Treaties of Russia
Treaties of Seychelles
Treaties of Spain
Treaties of Sweden
Treaties of Tanzania
Treaties of Turkey
Admiralty law treaties
1979 in labor relations